"I'm Flexin'" is a song by American hip hop recording artist T.I., featuring vocals and production from fellow Southern rapper Big K.R.I.T. It was officially released on October 4, 2011, as a buzz single for his eighth studio album Trouble Man: Heavy is the Head (2012). The song's release indicated T.I.'s return to the music business, following his 11-month prison sentence.

Background 
Since his release from incarceration, T.I. has appeared on and remixed songs from the likes of Future, 2 Chainz, Drake, Lil Wayne and Young Jeezy. "I'm Flexin'" serves as his first release as a lead artist, since his release from a half-way home on September 29, 2011. On September 23, 2011, XXL announced that DJ Drama revealed T.I. was planning on releasing a song-his first since going back to federal prison last November for a probation violation, on Monday, September 26, both produced and featuring Big K.R.I.T. The song's release was delayed, but later leaked on September 30, 2011. It was officially released to digital retailers, like iTunes and Amazon on October 4, 2011.

Music video 
On October 22, 2011, a behind-the-scenes video was released. It was directed by T.I.'s frequent collaborators Motion Family and was filmed in T.I.'s old neighborhood, Cedar Avenue, in his hometown of Atlanta, Georgia. As of April 2021 the video has over 10 million views.

Chart performance
The song first charted on the week of October 10, 2011 on the Hot R&B/Hip-Hop Songs at number sixty-eight. After six weeks on that chart it peaked at number thirty-two, falling to number thirty-seven the following week.

Chart positions

Release Information

Purchasable Release

References

External links
 

2011 singles
T.I. songs
Big K.R.I.T. songs
Grand Hustle Records singles
Songs written by T.I.
Songs written by Big K.R.I.T.
Song recordings produced by Big K.R.I.T.